Tringalwadi fort is located in the Igatpuri taluka of Nashik district. It is located on the ancient trade route passing through Thal ghat. The fort is located near village Tringalwadi. The Tringalwadi irrigation dam which is close to the village was built in 1978.

How to reach
The village Tringalwadi is located 7 km from Igatpuri. Igatpuri is located on Mumbai-nashik Railway route as well as National Highway NH 160. There are two routes to reach the village Tringalwadi from  Igatpuri first one passes through Igatpuri town and the other is by taking a northern exit to NH160 at Ghoti,  further passing through village Balayaduri. The Tringalwadi fort is located on a hill which runs north-south. It is a mesa rock formation. The climb is very easy and takes about 30 minutes to reach the top of the fort from the village.

History
The presence of the caves indicate that the caves and the fort might be constructed around 10th  century. The fort was built to overlook the trade route which connected Konkan to Nashik area. In 1636 the Shahaji (father of king Shivaji) had to cede it to the Moghuls after the defeat at mahulifort. It is not known when king Shivaji took control of this fort, but in 1688 this fort was won by Moghuls. It is one of the 16 forts which was surrendered to British in 1818 after the fall of Trymbakgad fort.

Places to see
At the foothills of the fort is a Jain Cave Temple with a beautifully carved entrance and a stone idol of the first Jain Tirthankara Rishabhanatha in the garbha gruha. The cave has a large sabha mandapa. the western entrance to the fort is a unique structure of architecture. The steps and the entrance gate are carved from a single rock.

There is an idol of veer Hanuman or maruti near the entrance gate and two sharabhaidols carved on the top of the entrance gate. On the fort are ruins of old buildings and a small Bhavanimata temple. There is a cave and a rock cut water cistern on the western side of the hillock on the fort.

See also
List of forts in Maharashtra
Nashik

Gallery

References

Buildings and structures of the Maratha Empire
Forts in Nashik district
16th-century forts in India